Republican Movement may refer to:

 Australian Republican Movement
 New Zealand Republic (formerly Republican Movement of Aotearoa New Zealand)
 British republican movement
 Citizens for a Canadian Republic
 Republican Movement (Colombia)
 Republican Movement (Ireland)
 Republican Movement (Mauritius)
 Republican Democratic Movement, a political party in Rwanda
 Senegalese Republican Movement
 Republican Movement (Switzerland)
 Movimiento Republicano, the Venezuelan Republican Movement
 Welsh Republican Movement

See also
 Republican (disambiguation)
 Republicanism